Dororon Enma-kun is an anime series created by Go Nagai. It features a group known as the Yōkai Patrol who come from Hell in order to hunt demons roaming in the real world. A remake of the anime, titled Dororon Enma-kun MeeraMera, is being produced by Brain's Base and began airing in Japan on April 7, 2011.

Episode List

Dororon Enma-kun (1973-1974)

Source(s)

Dororon Enma-kun MeeraMera (2011)

References

See also
Demon Prince Enma - A 2006 OVA series based on Dororon Enma-kun.

Dororon Enma-kun